Mid-Pacific Institute is a private, co-educational college preparatory school for grades preschool through twelve with an approximate enrollment of 1,538 students, the majority of whom are from Hawaii (although many also come from other states and other countries, such as Japan, South Korea, China, Canada, Australia, Marshall Islands and countries in Europe and Africa). The school offers programs of study in the International Baccalaureate Diploma Programme and the Mid-Pacific School of the Arts (MPSA).

History
The high school was established through the 1908 merger of Kawaiahao Seminary for Girls, founded in 1864, and Mills Institute for Boys, founded in 1892.  Both schools were founded by missionaries, with the goal of teaching English to native Hawaiians, Japanese, Chinese and other nationalities. It was established that the school must remain Christian so long as the original land was in use. However, students are allowed to practice any religion of their choice. Even members of the Hawaiian royal family attended the schools. By opening its doors to students with no prejudice over race and class status, Mid-Pacific was a part of a growing movement toward greater social acceptance that was rarely seen in the repressive oligarchical control within the Territory of Hawaii.  

A merger of the two schools was suggested in 1905 and the Hawaiian Board of Foreign Missions purchased  of land in Manoa valley. A ceremony was held on May 31, 1906,  for the new school campus, which officially opened in 1908. The two schools continued to operate independently while co-existing in the new campus  until the coeducation plan went into effect in the fall of 1922 and by June 1923 Mid-Pacific Institute became the common shared name.

The school added an elementary school when it merged with Epiphany School (which had been established as an elementary mission school by the Episcopal Church in 1937) in 2004.  The school had an on-campus dormitory from 1908 until it was closed in November 2003 and replaced by the new elementary school.

On February 23, 2012, Mid-Pacific announced it had ordered 1,500 iPads for all students and faculty, making it one of the first schools in the nation to equip every student K-12 with an iPad.

Mid-Pacific School of the Arts (MPSA)
The Mid-Pacific School of the Arts offers a preprofessional certificate program in dance, instrumental music, drama, and fine arts. The MPSA is the only certified program of its kind in the state of Hawaii. Students who complete their studies often move on to professional conservatories and other schools of performing and fine arts. MPI is unique in requiring all of its students to take a number of arts electives.

Students can take classes in dance, hula, instrumental music, media, musical theatre, theatre, visual arts, and voice.

The Mid-Pacific School of the Arts, which was formally established in 1991, is a member of the International Network of Performing and Visual Arts Schools and was among the first six schools in the nation to be recognized by the organization as a Network Star School. It also received the Arts Excellence Award from the Hawaii Alliance for Arts Education.

The International Baccalaureate
The International Baccalaureate Diploma Programme is a widely recognized and highly regarded two-year pre-university educational program that emphasizes rigorous, internationally based curriculum standards and promotes awareness and appreciation of global issues and perspectives. Students must take six subjects, and must also pass 3 extra requirements, for example, Theory of Knowledge (ToK), a 4000-word Extended Essay (EE), and a requirement of at least a total of 150 hours in CAS (Creativity, Action, Service). Mid-Pacific Institute was the first secondary school in the state of Hawaii to offer the International Baccalaureate Diploma Programme. The IB is administered by the International Baccalaureate Organization, which was founded in the 1968 in Geneva, Switzerland.

Mid-Pacific Athletics
The school's athletic affiliation is with the Interscholastic League of Honolulu. Mid-Pacific participates in intermediate, junior varsity and varsity level soccer, cross country, track & field, golf, softball, baseball, basketball, canoe paddling, tennis, bowling, volleyball, swimming and kayaking. Mid-Pacific Institute is one of nineteen smaller private schools that made up a larger unified team called Pac-5 Wolfpack, which allows the students to participate in certain high school athletic competition. Pac-Five began in 1973 to allow smaller institutions (of 1000 or fewer students per school) to form a football team and compete at a varsity level with bigger schools. Now, Pac-5 competes in wrestling, judo and water polo. Mid-Pacific announced that they would be leaving its affiliation with Pac-5 in 2023.

Mid-Pacific Institute has won state championships in baseball (1990-1992, 2002, 2013), Girls' Basketball (2017), Girls' Soccer (2011–2013), Boys' Soccer (2008, 2010, 2014, 2015), Boys' Sporter Air Riflery (2013, 2015, 2018), Girls' Sporter Air Riflery (2014, 2018), Girls' Swimming & Diving (2013, 2015), Boys' Canoe Paddling (2007), Boys' Golf (1985) and Softball (2011-2012). Through their affiliation with Pac-Five, they have also been part of state Football championships in 1982 and 1985.

Alma mater
Mid-Pacific's Alma mater was written by John L. Hopwood

Notable alumni and faculty

 Keiko Agena (1991), actor
Peter Apo (1957), musician
 Daniel Bess (1995), actor
Les Ihara, Jr. (1969), member of the Hawaii Senate
Irene ʻĪʻī Brown Holloway, philanthropist
 Katherine Kealoha,  former Deputy Prosecutor with the City and County of Honolulu and a convicted felon
 Ayaka Kimura (2000), actor, former member of Coconuts Musume in Hello! Project
 Maxine Hong Kingston, novelist, former faculty member
 Isiah Kiner-Falefa (2013), professional baseball infielder for the New York Yankees of Major League Baseball
 Rob Letterman (1988), American film director, writer and voice actor
 Kaiwi Lyman-Mersereau (2002), actor
 Lisa Matsumoto, author and playwright
 Chuck Mau (1926), former Hawaii Democratic Party Chairman 
 Ronald Moon (1958), Chief Justice of the Hawaii State Supreme Court
Scott Nishimoto (1992), member of the Hawaii House of Representatives
 Steere Noda (1911), former member of Hawaii Senate 
Mary Kawena Pukui (1910), author, Hawaiian scholar, educator 
 Peter Steigerwald (1992), comic book artist for Top Cow and later Aspen Comics
Kelly Sueda (1991), painter, art collector
Floyd Takeuchi (1971), media executive, publisher
 Glenn Wakai, Hawai'i State Senator
Samuel Yamashita (1964), professor, author
Kenichi Zenimura (1918), baseball player and promoter

References

External links
Official Website
Student Newspaper

Educational institutions established in 1908
Preparatory schools in Hawaii
Private K-12 schools in Honolulu
International Baccalaureate schools in Hawaii
1908 establishments in Hawaii